The Washington Secretary of State election, 2016, was held on November 8, 2016. Incumbent Republican Kim Wyman won reelection over Democratic nominee Tina Podlodowski, the two having received the most votes in an August 2016 primary election.

Kim Wyman was endorsed by the three preceding secretaries of state (Ralph Munro, Sam Reed, and Bruce Chapman), as well as the Seattle Times, King County Director of Elections Julie Wise, Pierce County Auditor Julie Anderson, the Washington Education Association, the Rental Housing Association of Washington, and the Sheet Metal, Air, Rail and Transportation Union. As of September 2016, Wyman had raised about $395,000 for her campaign.

Tina Podlodowski was endorsed by the incumbent, and two preceding, governors of Washington (Jay Inslee, Christine Gregoire, and Gary Locke), as well as Lakewood city councilor Mary Moss, the Washington State High School Democrats, and The Stranger. As of September 2016, Podlodowski had raised about $460,000 for her campaign.

Polling
Graphical summary

By congressional district

Wyman won 8 of 10 congressional districts, including 5 that also went for Hillary Clinton.

See also
 Washington secretary of state election, 2012

Notes

References

secreatry of state
2016
November 2016 events in the United States
2016 United States state secretary of state elections